Saffordoceras is an actinoceratid from the Middle Ordovician, found in eastern North America, characterized by a flattened venter; sutures with broad, deep ventral lobes and narrow lateral saddles; and subventral siphuncle with segments decreasing from about 0.3 to less than 0.2 the shell diameter. Saffordoceras is probably derived from Actinoceras.  Related contemporary genera include Paractinoceras and Troostoceras

References
 Curt Teichert, 1964. Actinoceratoidea. Treatise on Invertebrate Paleontology, Part K. Geological Soc of America and Univ of Kansas Press.

Actinocerida
Ordovician cephalopods of North America
Prehistoric nautiloid genera